Giovanni Cianfriglia (born 5 April 1935) is an Italian film actor. He has appeared in more than 100 films since 1958.

Career 
Born in Anzio, Cianfriglia debuted as the body double of Steve Reeves in Hercules, then he started appearing, often uncredited, as a stuntman in dozens of genre films. Since the second half of the sixties he starred in several adventure films and Spaghetti Westerns in leading roles using the stage name Ken Wood.

Selected filmography

 The Trojan Horse (1961)
 Sandokan the Great (1963)
 Revenge of The Gladiators (1964) 
 Castle of Blood (1964)
 Hercules the Avenger (1965) 
 Desperate Mission (1965)
 Superargo Versus Diabolicus (1966)
 Massacre Mania (1967)
 The Devil's Man (1967)
 Golden Chameleon (1967)
 Superargo and the Faceless Giants (1968)
 Bury Them Deep (1968)
 Kill Them All and Come Back Alone (1968)
 Gunman Sent by God (1968)
 Drummer of Vengeance (1971)
 Life Is Tough, Eh Providence? (1972)
 Peur sur la ville (1975)
 Who Breaks... Pays (1975)
 Killer Cop (1975)
 The Climber (1975)
 Keoma (1976)
 Everything Happens to Me (1980)
 Buddy Goes West (1981)
 Tuareg – The Desert Warrior (1984)
 Le comiche (1990)
 Alex l'ariete (2000)

References

External links

1935 births
Living people
People from Anzio
Italian male film actors
20th-century Italian male actors